The triplet lily Triteleia bridgesii (previously Brodiaea bridgesii) is known by the common name Bridges' brodiaea. It is found in the foothills and low elevation mountains of California and Oregon, often in areas of serpentine soil.

It is an attractive perennial flower often planted as an ornamental. The plant sends up long, erect green stems which branch near the top into several smaller stems which bear the blooms. The flowers are bright purple or lavender, tubular at first and then opening into six-pointed star shapes.

References

External links

Jepson Manual Treatment
Flora of North America
Photo gallery

bridgesii
Flora of California
Flora of Oregon
Flora of the Klamath Mountains
Flora of the Sierra Nevada (United States)
Natural history of the California chaparral and woodlands
Endemic flora of the United States
Flora without expected TNC conservation status